Muthana Mithqal Sartawi is a Kuwaiti orthopedic surgeon specialized in joint replacement surgery. He is best known for inventing the Modified Intervastus Approach surgical approach used in  total knee replacement surgery. He has operated on notable individuals including Saud bin Fahd Al Saud and was part of the medical team that performed the knee replacement for George W. Bush.

Background 
Sartawi completed his medical degree from Arabian Gulf University in 2006, and went on to conduct his training at the General Surgery Department at Farwaniya Hospital in Kuwait. In 2007, he relocated to Canada after receiving a scholarship to train as a neurosurgery resident for three years in the department of neurosurgery at the University of Alberta, Canada. In 2013, he completed residency at the department of orthopedics at Dalhousie University in Halifax, Canada.

In 2014, Sartawi completed a fellowship in joint replacement surgery at Rush University Medical Center in Chicago, Illinois. He joined the faculty of surgery at the University of Illinois from 2014 to 2019 and has served as director of the Joint Care Center of Excellence at Presence Hospital in Illinois. He was appointed head of the orthopedic department at Christie Clinic in Champaign, Illinois.

In 2018, he patented the Modified Intervastus Approach, a surgical technique in knee replacement surgery where the surrounding ligaments and muscles of the knee are preserved, helping to shorten the recovery period. This technique was patented by the United States Patent and Trademark Office. He has received other patents in the field of orthopedics. Sartawi is both American and Canadian board-certified.

His achievements were recognized by Emir of Kuwait Sabah al-Ahmad al-Jaber al-Sabah who named Sartawi as a source of pride to Kuwait, and by Kuwait Youth Sports Authority.

Selected publications 
Selected publications by Muthana M. Sartawi include the following:

References 

Living people
Year of birth missing (living people)
Arabian Gulf University alumni
Kuwaiti physicians
Kuwaiti emigrants to the United States
Fellows of the Royal College of Physicians and Surgeons of Canada
Patent holders
Orthopedic surgeons

External links 
 Official personal website (in English)
 Employer's official website